Minister for Children or Minister of Children may refer to:

 Minister for Child Protection (Western Australia), a ministerial position in the Government of Western Australia
 Minister for Children (United Kingdom), a Minister of State in the Government of the UK
 Minister for Children, the Elderly and Equality (Sweden), a ministerial post in the Government of Sweden
 Minister of Children and Family Affairs, a cabinet position in the Government of Norway
 Ministry of Children and Family Development (British Columbia), a cabinet position in the Government of British Columbia, Canada
 Minister for Children and Young People, a junior ministerial position in the Scottish Government
 Minister for Children, Equality, Disability, Integration and Youth, a senior cabinet position in the Government of Ireland
 Ministry of Children, Community and Social Services, a cabinet position in the Government of Ontario, Canada